Reynaldo Anderson Jaen (born 12 April 1986), name also spelled as Reinaldo Anderson, is a Panamanian football defender who currently plays for Liga Panameña de Fútbol side Árabe Unido

Club career
A tall central defender, Anderson played for Atlético Veragüense before moving abroad to play for Brazilian outfit Ipatinga. He returned to Panama in 2007 for a lengthy spell with Árabe Unido. In summer 2009, Anderson joined Costa Rican side Ramonense on a year loan. He left Árabe Unido in January 2014 for Sporting San Miguelito.

He joined Árabe Unido in summer 2004.

International career
Anderson made his debut for Panama in a March 2007 friendly match against Haiti and has earned a total of 5 caps, scoring no goals (including an unofficial, abandoned match against Mexico in September 2007). He was non-playing squad member at the 2007 CONCACAF Gold Cup.

His final international was a September 2007 friendly against Venezuela.

Honors

Club
Liga Panameña de Fútbol (1): 2008 (C)

References

External links

1986 births
Sportspeople from Colón, Panama
Association football defenders
Panamanian footballers
Panama international footballers
2007 CONCACAF Gold Cup players
C.D. Árabe Unido players

Sporting San Miguelito players
Panamanian expatriate footballers
Expatriate footballers in Brazil
Living people